= August Theodor Låstbom =

Swedish historian

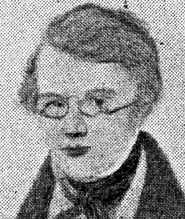
August Theodor Låstbom (1815-1845) portrait

August Theodor Låstbom (1815–1845) was a Swedish historian.

== Biography ==
He was born in 1815 in Västerås, Sweden. In 1842 he wrote Swea och Götha höfdinga-minne sedan. In 1843 he wrote Konungariket Norges Ståthållare, Stifts-Amtmän, Amtmän och Commendanter sedan år 1814. He made many Contributions to swedish dictionary. He died in 1845 in Uppsala.

== Works ==
- Matrikel öfver ordinarie tjenstemän vid församlingarna och läroverken i Sverige
- Swea och Götha höfdinga-minne sedan 1720, 2 vols. Upsala, 1842–43
- Konungariket Norges Ståthållare, Stifts-Amtmän, Amtmän och Commendanter sedan år 1814, eller detta Rikes förening med Swerige, Upsala, 1843
